Associated Food Stores is an American retailers cooperative that supplies about 500 independently owned retail supermarkets throughout Utah, Arizona, Idaho, Colorado, Montana, Oregon, Nevada, and Wyoming.

Description
The headquarters for Associated Foods is located at 1850 W 2100 South in Salt Lake City, Utah, United States. The company's President and CEO is Bob Obray. He replaced Neal Berube after Neal retired in December 2020. It reported over US$1.6 billion (equivalent to $ billion in ) in sales during fiscal year 2007 and is currently the fifty-sixth largest grocery retailer in the country by volume  with 23% of its total sales coming from its corporate stores.

History
Associated Food Stores was founded in 1940 by Donald P. Lloyd, president of the Utah Retail Grocers Association along with 34 Utah retailers. Concerned with the effect that large corporate stores would have on small independent retailers, he felt the only way these small businesses could survive is if they united and faced the competition as one, therefore increasing their collective buying power. He convinced 34 stores to donate $300 (equivalent to $ in ) to help build an independent and "associated" warehouse.

In 1999, Associated Food Stores purchased Utah grocery store chain Macey's. In August 2017, Macey's broke with 70-year tradition by deciding to open some of their stores on Sundays.

In 2009, Associated Food Stores purchased 34 Albertsons stores in Utah from Supervalu Inc. The stores were renamed Associated Fresh Market (more commonly known as just "Fresh Market"). As of June 2017, however, only 17 of the originally purchased locations were still under the Fresh Market banner, the rest having been either closed or sold.

In 2017, two Fresh Market locations in Murray and Holladay were re-branded as Macey's.

As of 2021, three Macey's locations have closed: the Logan (400 North), Clinton, and the Midvale/Sandy locations.

In 2022, a former Fresh Market in American Fork became a Macey's.

Corporate stores
As well as supplying independent grocers, Associated Food Stores also owns several corporate stores under five different names, operating a total of 38 locations.
 Macey's is their largest brand, and has 17 locations across the Wasatch Front, Tooele, and the Logan area.
 Here are the locations, all are in Utah:
Draper
 Logan/Providence
 Ogden
 Taylorsville
 West Valley City - Granger
 SLC - Parleys Way
 SLC - Mount Olympus
 Holladay
 West Jordan
 Orem
 Highland
 Lehi
 Pleasant Grove
 Provo
 Spanish Fork
Santaquin
 American Fork
 Murray
Tooele

 Fresh Market was created after their acquisition of most of the Albertsons locations in Utah. There are currently only two Albertsons left in Utah, which are in Washington and Saint George. There are currently 10 locations along the Wasatch Front and in Park City. This is significantly fewer than the 34 locations they originally purchased from Albertsons.
 Their locations
 Park City (Deer Valley Drive)
 Park City (Kilby Road)
 Ogden
 South Ogden
 Layton
 SLC (900 East)
 SLC (2300 East)
 Provo
Lin's has 7 locations in St. George, Hurricane, Cedar City, Richfield, Price, and Overton, Nevada.
Dan's has 2 locations in Salt Lake County. The locations are in Cottonwood Heights and SLC. Two former Salt Lake City locations have closed, one was replaced by a JoAnn, and the other was replaced by a Macey's.
Dick's Market has 2 locations in Davis County. They're located in Bountiful and Centerville.

Other stores

Popular stores owned and/or supplied by Associated Food Stores:

 Broulim's (Idaho, & Wyoming)
 Clark's Market (Arizona, Colorado, and Utah)
 Dan's Market (Utah)
 Dick's Market (Utah)
 Finley's Food Farm (Montana)
 Fresh Market (Utah)
 Harmons (Utah)
 Kent's Market (4 locations, Utah)
 Lee's Marketplace (7 locations Utah)
 Lin's Market (7 locations)
 Macey's (Utah)
 Peterson's Fresh Market (Utah)
 Raine's Market (Nevada)
 Reams (Utah)
Soelberg's Market (Utah)
Ridley's Family Markets (3 locations, Utah)
 Winegar's Market (Utah)
 Stokes Market (Utah & Idaho)

Western Family

Associated Food Stores was a primary distributor of the popular store brand Western Family owned by Western Family Foods before being replaced by Food Club and other Topco brands. This also includes Better Buy, Shurfine, Shursavings, and Marketchoice brands.

References

External links

'''Official websites for stores owned and/or supplied by Associated Foods:
 Clark's Market
 Dan's
 Dick's Market
 Fresh Market
 Harmons
 Kent's Market
 Lee's Marketplace
 Lin's Market
 Macey's
 Peterson's
 Raine's Market
 Reams
 Ridley's Family Markets
 Wingars

Companies based in Salt Lake City
Privately held companies based in Utah
Economy of the Western United States
American companies established in 1940
Retail companies established in 1940
Supermarkets of the United States
Retailers' cooperatives in the United States
1940 establishments in Utah